The canton of Saint-Malo-1 is an administrative division of the Ille-et-Vilaine department, in northwestern France. It was created at the French canton reorganisation which came into effect in March 2015. Its seat is in Saint-Malo.

It consists of the following communes: 
Cancale 
La Gouesnière
Saint-Coulomb
Saint-Malo (partly)
Saint-Méloir-des-Ondes

References

Cantons of Ille-et-Vilaine